Halcyornithidae or Pseudasturidae  is a family of fossil birds, possibly belonging to the order Psittaciformes (parrots and relatives). Members of this family lived in the Eocene, around 55-48 million years ago. Fossil remains are known from the Green River Formation in the United States and from the London Clay formation in the United Kingdom. They were probably the sister group to the owl-like Messelasturidae.

Classification
Cyrilavis
Halcyornis
Pulchrapollia
Pseudasturides
Precursor? (probably a chimera)

References 

Parrots
Eocene birds
Prehistoric birds of Europe
Prehistoric birds of North America
Prehistoric bird families